The following results are the 2019 European Mixed Team Badminton Championships's main draw.

Squads

Groups 
The groups were published on 13 December 2018.

Results

Group 1 

Denmark vs. France

Netherlands vs. Spain

Denmark vs. Netherlands

France vs. Spain

Denmark vs. Spain

France vs. Netherlands

Group 2 

England vs. Russia

Ireland vs. Germany

England vs. Ireland

Russia vs. Germany

England vs. Germany

Russia vs. Ireland

Reference 

European Mixed Team Badminton Championships